Virgin Superannuation is a superannuation, or pension fund, offered by Virgin subsidiary Virgin Money.

In Australia
Virgin Super launched in 2005 under the Virgin Money Australia brand. Backed by fund manager Macquarie Investment Management Limited, Virgin Super uses index tracking which eliminates the risk of picking one of the many under-performing fund managers.

Virgin Super Baby Break
In 2010, Virgin Super launched the Virgin Super Baby Break, meaning Australian parents are exempt from super fees whilst they are on maternity or paternity leave.

Gold Rating 2010
Virgin Money was awarded a Gold Rating for 2010 for its Virgin Super product by independent superannuation research company SuperRatings.

References

External links
Virgin Money Australia website

Pension funds
Virgin Money